

The Avid Aircraft Magnum is an American two-seat homebuilt cabin monoplane which was designed and sold as kits by Avid Aircraft of Caldwell, Idaho.

Design and development
The Magnum is a high-wing strut-braced monoplane with a welded steel tube fuselage, the wings have aluminium spars and wooden ribs covered with Ceconite. The enclosed cabin has side-by-side configuration seating for two with an option for an additional seat in the baggage area for two children or a small adult. It has a fixed conventional landing gear with a tailwheel and some are fitted with floats.

By 2010 the aircraft was back in production by the Airdale Flyer Company of Rhinelander, Wisconsin. The Airdale version includes some modifications, including enlarged landing gear, plus optional tricycle landing gear.

Specifications (fitted with a 160hp O-320 engine)

References

Notes

Bibliography

External links

Magnum
Airdale aircraft
1990s United States civil utility aircraft
Homebuilt aircraft